Norman Hendrik Odinga (born February 11, 1963) is a Canadian retired international soccer player.

Club career
Odinga was named MVP of the University of Alberta and played for the Edmonton Eagles, Edmonton Brick Men and Vancouver 86ers.

International career
Odinga made his debut for Canada in an April 1989 friendly match against Denmark and earned a total of 8 caps, scoring 1 goal. He also played in a non official match against Mexico in March 1991.

He has represented Canada at the inaugural 1989 FIFA Futsal World Championship.

His final international game was a July 1993 World Cup qualification match against Australia.

International goals
Scores and results list Canada's goal tally first.

Coaching career
He currently is head coach of an U14 girls team in Alberta.

References

External links

1963 births
Living people
Association football midfielders
Canadian men's futsal players 
Canada men's under-23 international soccer players
Canada men's international soccer players
Canadian soccer players
Edmonton Eagles players
Edmonton Brick Men players
Soccer players from Edmonton
University of Alberta alumni
Vancouver Whitecaps (1986–2010) players
Canadian Professional Soccer League (original) players
Western Soccer Alliance players
Canadian Soccer League (1987–1992) players
American Professional Soccer League players